Dr. Marc Edmund Jones (October 1, 1888 – March 5, 1980) was an American writer, screenwriter and astrologer.

Early life

Born October 1, 1888, 8:37 a.m. CST in St. Louis, Missouri, as a child Marc Edmund Jones was interested in complex patterns observable in the environment, and he gradually developed a distinctive personal system of thought that later produced notable perspectives on occultism and the cabalistic world-view in general.

He grew up in Chicago in the social framework of a rather formal, late Victorian parental style. Other early influences were the Christian Science neighbors who moved next door and an aunt who introduced him to theosophy. In 1913 his lifelong interest in astrology was kindled, leading to further investigation into occult principles, and an interest in spiritualism that developed later on.

Work
Marc Jones has been called the dean of American astrology, and is perhaps best remembered as the major leader in the twentieth century of a movement to reformulate the study of astrology.

He developed the seven categories of horoscopic patterns or distributions of the astrological planets around the zodiac, which are called the Splay, Splash, Bundle, Bowl, Locomotive, Bucket, and Seesaw shapes or patterns.

He created the Sabian Symbols with the assistance of the clairvoyant Elsie Wheeler in 1925, and in 1953 he published The Sabian Symbols in Astrology, a book that renders a specific symbol and interpretive character for each of the 360 degrees of the zodiac that are found on the astronomical ecliptic.

Early in life he became a prolific and successful writer of movie scenarios, and worked in that profession for many years. He founded the special-studies group known as the Sabian Assembly in 1923, still in existence in the twenty-first century.  He was ordained as a Presbyterian minister in 1934, and later received the PhD degree from Columbia University. He taught and lectured across the USA for many years. 

His most voluminous written work is the set of Sabian lessons on philosophy, the Bible, astrology and cabalistic pattern, at which he labored for decades.

Dr. Jones died on March 5, 1980. His major visible legacy exists today in the Sabian Assembly which he founded and his many books, most which are still in print.

Published works
How To Learn Astrology
The Guide To Horoscope Interpretation
Horary Astrology
Astrology: How & Why It Works
The Sabian Symbols In Astrology
Essentials Of Astrological Analysis
Scope Of Astrological Prediction
Mundane Perspectives In Astrology
Fundamentals Of Number Significance
The Counseling Manual In Astrology
How To Live With The Stars
The Marc Edmund Jones 500
George Sylvester Morris: Philosophical Career & Theistic Idealism
Gandhi Lives
Occult Philosophy
The Sabian Manual: A Ritual For Living
The Sabian Book Of Letters To Aspirants
Man, Magic And Fantasy
"Ten Words Of Power"
"Patterns Of Consciousness: The Ibn Gabirol Squares"

External links
 
 Astrology's Memorial to Marc Edmund Jones and His Work
 Non-Sabian Astrologer Perspective on Marc Edmund Jones
 Marc Edmund Jones in the Fiction Magazine Index

References

American astrologers
1888 births
1980 deaths
20th-century astrologers